Linda Ronstadt  is the third solo studio album by Linda Ronstadt, released in early 1972 on the Capitol Records label. The album was a sales failure, prompting Linda's exit from Capitol Records.  It peaked at number 163 on Billboard's  Pop Album Chart and at number 35 on Billboard's Country Album Chart. It is considered to be a front-runner in the country rock music genre.

History
Before recording the album, Ronstadt hired guitarist Glenn Frey to assemble a touring band; Frey did so with members of drummer Don Henley’s band Shiloh, who were signed to Amos Records at the same time as Frey’s previous band, Longbranch Pennywhistle.  The touring band, augmented by pedal steel guitarist Sneaky Pete Kleinow and producer John Boylan on guitar, accompanied Ronstadt on six of the album’s ten tracks, including three that were recorded live at The Troubadour nightclub in West Hollywood, California during March of 1971.  The other members of the original Eagles lineup, guitarist Bernie Leadon and bassist Randy Meisner, appeared on other tracks as session musicians, with Meisner accompanying Ronstadt on backing vocals with the live band on “Birds” and “Rescue Me”.  Frey, Henley, Leadon and Meisner formed the Eagles, with Ronstadt's approval,  after the album's release.  Other notable session musicians on the album include violinist Gib Guilbeau, pedal steel guitarist Buddy Emmons, harmonica player Jimmy Fadden of the Nitty Gritty Dirt Band, and Herb Pedersen on guitar, banjo and backing vocals.

The lack of major success with this and preceding albums led to Ronstadt's decision to leave Capitol. After signing with Asylum Records and recording her first album with them, however, Ronstadt was required to release her 1974 album, Heart Like a Wheel on Capitol to fulfil her contract. Ironically, it would become her breakout album.

Track listing 
"I Fall to Pieces," "Birds," and "Rescue Me" are live performances.

Personnel
Adapted from album's liner notes.

 Linda Ronstadt – lead vocals, arrangements (2, 7), tambourine (10)
 Barry Beckett – keyboards (3)
 John Boylan – guitar (1, 2, 5, 6, 8, 9), arrangements (2, 5, 9)
 Glenn Frey – guitar (1, 6, 8–10), arrangements (1), backing vocals (9, 10)
 Sneaky Pete Kleinow – pedal steel guitar (1, 2, 6, 8, 10)
 Richard Bowden – electric guitar (2)
 Tippy Armstrong – guitar (3)
 Weldon Myrick – steel guitar (3)
 Bernie Leadon – guitar (4, 5, 7), backing vocals (5, 7)
 Herb Pedersen – guitar (4), backing vocals (5, 7), banjo (7)
 Dean Webb – mandolin (4)
Moon Martin – backing vocals (4), guitar (8, 10)
 Buddy Emmons – pedal steel guitar (5, 9)
 Michael Bowden – bass guitar (1, 2, 6, 8–10)
 David Hood – bass guitar (3)
 Wesley Pritchett – bass guitar (4)
 Randy Meisner – bass guitar (5), backing vocals (8, 10)
 Lyle Ritz – bass guitar (7)
 Don Henley – drums (1, 2, 6, 8, 9, 10), backing vocals (8, 9, 10)
 Roger Hawkins – drums (3)
 Mike Botts – drums (5)
 Jimmie Fadden – harmonica (7)
 Gib Guilbeau – fiddle (2, 4, 6, 7), backing vocals (4)
 J.D. Souther –  backing vocals (2), lead and harmony vocals
 Merry Clayton – backing vocals (3)
 Dianne Davidson – backing vocals (3)
 Miss Ona – backing vocals (3)

Production notes:
 John Boylan – producer
 Al Coury – production coordinator 
 Don Blake – engineer
 Larry Hamby – engineer
 Rudy Hill – engineer
 Wally Heider – engineer
 Mike Shields – engineer, mixing, mastering
 Ray Thompson – engineer
 Dean Torrence – design
 John Hoernle – art direction
 Ed Caraeff – photography

Studios
 Recorded at United Western Recorders and The Troubadour (Hollywood, California); Muscle Shoals Sound Studios (Sheffield, Alabama).
 Mixed and Mastered at NEMO Productions.

Charts

References 

Linda Ronstadt albums
1971 albums
Albums produced by John Boylan (record producer)
Capitol Records albums
Albums with cover art by Dean Torrence
Albums recorded at the Troubadour
Albums recorded at Wally Heider Studios
Albums recorded at United Western Recorders